Drakeford government can refer to
First Drakeford government, the Welsh Government led by Mark Drakeford from 2018 to 2021
Second Drakeford government, the Welsh Government led by Mark Drakeford from 2021 to present